Mutthu Ondu Mutthu is a 1979 Indian Kannada film, directed by R. N. Jayagopal and is based on the novel Hoobaana, written by M. K. Indira. The film stars Anant Nag, Roopa Chakravarthy, Sundar Krishna Urs and Vasudeva Rao in the lead roles. The film has musical score by G. K. Venkatesh.

Cast

 Anant Nag as Anand / Dr. Madhukar
 Roopa Chakravarthy as Muthu
 Sundar Krishna Urs
 M. V. Vasudeva Rao
 Gangadhar in guest appearance
 Rajashankar in guest appearance
 Shashikala

References

External links
 

1970s Kannada-language films
Films scored by G. K. Venkatesh